Henri 'Rik' François Louis Coppens (29 April 1930 – 5 February 2015) was a Belgian footballer who played as a striker. He played 389 games and scored 261 goals for Beerschot AC. Coppens won the first Belgian Golden Shoe in 1954. After his career as a player, he became a coach with Tubantia Borgerhout (1970–1971), Berchem (1971–1974 and 1977–1981), Beerschot (1974–1977 and 1981–1984) and Club Brugge (1981).

Honours

Individual 
 Belgian First Division top scorer: 1952-53 (35 goals), 1954-55 (35 goals)
 Belgian Golden Shoe: 1954
 Belgian Golden Shoe of the 20th Century (1995): 4th place
Platina Eleven (Best Team in 50 Years of Golden Shoe Winners) (2003)

References

External links
 
 

1930 births
2015 deaths
1954 FIFA World Cup players
Belgian football managers
Belgian footballers
Belgium international footballers
K. Berchem Sport players
R. Olympic Charleroi Châtelet Farciennes players
K. Berchem Sport managers
Club Brugge KV head coaches
Association football forwards
K. Beerschot V.A.C. players
K.V.V. Crossing Elewijt players
Footballers from Antwerp